Blood of the Earth is the twenty sixth studio album by the British space rock group Hawkwind, released on 21 June 2010.

Although it is a new studio album, there are some new versions of older songs. "You’d Better Believe It" was originally released on their 1974 album Hall of the Mountain Grill, and "Sweet Obsession" was originally released on Dave Brock's 1984 solo album Earthed to the Ground.

There is a limited 2CD edition, containing live tracks and an interview. "Tide of the Century" was originally recorded by Tim Blake on his 2000 solo album The Tide of the Century. The cover version of "Long Gone" was recorded for Mojo's Syd Barrett special edition of The Madcap Laughs.

Track listing

Disc 1

Disc 2 – (Live)
"Space" (Brock)
"Angels of Death" (Brock)
"Wraith" (Darbyshire, Hone, Blake, Chadwick)
"Tide of the Century" (Blake)
"Magnu" (Brock)
"Levitation" (Brock)
"Long Gone" (Syd Barrett)
Interview 2010

Personnel
Hawkwind
Dave Brock – guitar, keyboards, vocals
Niall Hone – guitar, bass guitar, keyboards, sampling
Mr. Dibs – bass guitar, vocals
Tim Blake – keyboards
Richard Chadwick – drums, vocals
Matthew Wright - vocals on "Blood of the Earth"
Jason Stuart - keyboards on "Starshine"
Jon Sevink - violin on Live CD

Release history
21 June 2010: Eastworld Recordings, EWO042CD, UK, CD
21 June 2010: Eastworld Recordings, EWO043CDLTD, UK, 2xCD
21 June 2010: Eastworld Recordings, RCV030LP, UK, vinyl

References

2010 albums
Hawkwind albums